Stig Håkan Larsson is a Swedish writer of novels, dramas, poetry, political essays and short stories, film writer, director and actor.

Biography
Larsson was born on 20 July 1955, in Skellefteå, Västerbottens län. He grew up in Umeå and currently lives in Stockholm.

In the late 1970, his namesake and friend, Stieg Larsson, ne Stig, the well-known author of the Millennium series, changed slightly the spelling of his first name to avoid confusion with Stig, by then a well-known writer. 

Larsson was a member of the Kris editorial staff.

His first success was in 1979  with Autisterna, since, Stig Larsson has established himself as one of Sweden's best-known and influential authors. "His instinct for psychological and emotional violence has been compared to that of August Strindberg and Ingmar Bergman."
He has published over 20 books including novels, short stories, and poetry collections. He has also written and directed internationally successful stage plays such as Vd and Systrar, bröder. In 1989, he wrote and directed his feature film debut Ängel, followed by The Rabbit Man in 1990. He has directed TV movies such as Under isen (1991) and Nigger (1991), and written screenplays for films such as Kristian Petris's acclaimed Sommaren (1995).

Bibliography

Prose
Autisterna, 1979
Nyår, 1984
Introduktion, 9
Komedin I, 1989
Om en död, 1992 (short stories)
När det känns att det håller på ta slut, 2012

Poetry
Minuterna före blicken, 1981
Den andra resan, 1982
Samtidigt, på olika platser, 1985
Deras ordning, 1987
Händ!, 1988
Ändras, 1990
Ett kommande arbete, 1991
Uttal, 1992
En andra resa, 1993 (collection)
Likar, 1993
Ordningen, 1994 (collection)
Matar, 1995
Natta de mina, 1997
Wokas lax?, 1998
Helhjärtad tanke, 1999
Avklädda på ett fält, 2000

Drama
VD, 1987
Pjäser, 1991
Realism: två pjäser och ett filmmanus, 2011

Journalism and essays
Artiklar 1975–2004, 2006
Folk på ön – With photographs by Ulla , 2017

Filmography

Writer
1988 VD (TV movie) (play / screenplay)
1989 Ängel (writer)
1989 Miraklet i Valby (writer)
1990 The Rabbit Man (Kaninmannen)
1995 Svinet (TV film)
1995 Sommaren
1997 Grötbögen (TV film)
2000 Jesus lever (TV film)
2009 Metropía (screenplay)

Director
1988 VD (TV play)
1989 Ängel
1990 Nigger (TV film)
1990 The Rabbit Man (Kaninmannen)
1991 Under isen (TV film)
2007 August (TV film)

Actor
1984 The Element of Crime (Forbrydelsens element) (Coroner's Assistant)
1989 Ängel (Stig)
2006 Sök (Bo)

References

1955 births
Living people
People from Skellefteå Municipality
Swedish Roman Catholics
Writers from Västerbotten
Swedish male writers
Swedish film directors
Best Screenplay Guldbagge Award winners
Dobloug Prize winners